John Matthew Crennan (5 August 1880 – 26 April 1924) was an Australian rules footballer who played with St Kilda in the Victorian Football League (VFL).

References

External links 

1880 births
1924 deaths
Australian rules footballers from Victoria (Australia)
St Kilda Football Club players
Australian military personnel of World War I